Valentina Gospodinova (Bulgarian: Валентина Господинова; 30 January 1987) is a Bulgarian football striker currently playing in the Bulgarian AFG for NSA Sofia, with whom she has also played the UEFA Women's Champions League. She is a member of the Bulgarian national team.

References

1987 births
Living people
Bulgarian women's footballers
Bulgaria women's international footballers
Women's association football forwards
FC NSA Sofia players